Le Diable et les Dix Commandements is a French film from 1962 directed by Julien Duvivier that consists of seven sketches (eight in the versions shown in Germany and Japan) played by an ensemble cast that includes Michel Simon, Micheline Presle, Françoise Arnoul, Mel Ferrer, Charles Aznavour, Lino Ventura, Fernandel, Alain Delon, Danielle Darrieux, Jean-Claude Brialy, and Louis de Funès.

The film contrasts a series of human failings with the ever-present hope of redemption and a snake (voiced by Claude Rich) adds the Devil's comments.

Plot 

Episode 1  Jérôme, the old handyman at a convent, is warned that he will lose his job if he continues to take the name of the Lord in vain, but is saved when the visiting bishop proves to be an old school friend.

Episode 2 To obtain a beautiful necklace, Françoise succumbs to the wealthy Philip, husband of her friend Micheline. Her husband Georges finds the necklace she had hidden and gives it to Micheline after a happy afternoon together.

Episode 3 Denis, a Jesuit novice, leaves the order to avenge his sister's suicide, which was provoked by Garigny, who seduced her into prostitution and drug addiction. The police tell him that Garigny, if  convicted for pimping and dealing, would only get a few years. He arranges to confront Garigny alone and unarmed, but in fact has a concealed shotgun. When he says he is leaving to inform the police, Garigny grabs the gun and shoots him dead. In fact Denis had already alerted the police, who arrest Garigny for murder.

Episode 4 A stranger arrives at an isolated farm, saying that he is God. He gets the grandfather, who had pretended to be paralysed, out of his chair and walking, and then eases the last moments of the dying grandmother. On his way out, he is found by the psychiatric nurses who have been looking for him.

Episode 5 Pierre, a medical student who is nearly 21, has a tense relationship with his taciturn father Marcel and shrewish mother Germaine. Out of the blue, Marcel tells him his real mother was Clarisse, now a noted stage actress. When he visits Clarisse after a rehearsal, she first tries to seduce the handsome young stranger and then, without ceasing to be flirtatious, retreats into vagueness once she is told the truth. Realising that she is not worth his time, Pierre resolves to be a good son to the couple who have brought him up.

Episode 6 Having lost interest in his job as a bank cashier, Didier is told to leave at the end of the week. When a gunman appears at his position, he fills the man's suitcase with notes and coins. He then tracks down the thief, breaks into his apartment, and recovers the case. The thief then tracks him down and, after much argument, the two agree to share the loot. On opening the case, it contains bread, wine, and a sausage. The tramp who had substituted his lunch for the money is arrested for the theft.

Episode 7
From Episode 1, Jérôme and the bishop are enjoying a well-lubricated lunch, after which the bishop has difficulty in remembering what are the Ten Commandments.

Cast

1st episode 
 Michel Simon : Jérôme Chambard
 Lucien Baroux : Monsignor Trousselier
 Claude Nollier : Mother Superior
 Albert Michel : vegetable seller
 Nina Myral : a nun (uncredited)

2nd episode 
 Micheline Presle : Micheline Allan
 Françoise Arnoul : Françoise Beaufort
 Mel Ferrer : Philip Allan
 Claude Dauphin : Georges Beaufort
 Marcel Dalio : jeweller (uncredited)
 Claude Piéplu : security guard (uncredited)
 Marie-France Pisier : girl at a dance (uncredited)

3rd episode 
 Charles Aznavour : Denis Mayeux
 Lino Ventura : Garigny, the pimp
 Maurice Biraud : Louis, police inspector 
 Maurice Teynac : Father Superior
 Clément Harari : Garigny's muscle

4th episode 
 Fernandel : the madman 
 Germaine Kerjean : grandmother
 Gaston Modot : grandfather
 René Clermont : father

5th episode 
 Alain Delon : Pierre Messager
 Danielle Darrieux : Clarisse Ardant 
 Madeleine Robinson : Germaine Messager
 Georges Wilson : Marcel Messager
 Roland Armontel : Mercier
 Hubert Noël : Clarisse's lover
 Dominique Paturel : actor
 Gaby Basset : Clarisse's dresser
 Raoul Marco : actor

6th episode 
 Jean-Claude Brialy : Didier Marin, the bank clerk
 Louis de Funès : Antoine Vaillant, the bank raider
 Noël Roquevert : police inspector

7th épisode 
 Michel Simon : Jérôme Chambard
 Lucien Baroux : Monsignor Trousselier

Reception
According to the US critic Bosley Crowther, only one of the seven episodes tickled him, that in which  Louis de Funès and Jean-Claude Brialy star.

See also 
 The Ten Commandments (1956 film)

References

External links 
 
 
 Der Teufel und die zehn Gebote at the defunes.de
 Bosley Crowther, Le Diable et les Dix Commandements, The New York Times, October 15, 1963
 

1962 films
1962 comedy-drama films
French comedy-drama films
1960s French-language films
French anthology films
French black-and-white films
Films directed by Julien Duvivier
Fiction about God
Films shot in Bruges
Ten Commandments
The Devil in film
Films with screenplays by Michel Audiard
1960s French films